VIVA was an Austrian free-to-air television channel launched 2012 as the localised feed of VIVA Germany. In June 2018, Viacom announced that it will shut down all Viva operations worldwide by 31 December 2018.

History

VIVA Austria was launched in May 2012, 15 per cent of the channels output consists of Austrian music, Chartshows and lifestyle programming taloried to the Austrian market.  The channels marketing and promotion are done by Goldback Media. Prior to 2012, VIVA Germany aired across Austria with localized advertising and sponsorship for Austria.

From 8 September 2014, VIVA aired between 6 am and 5 pm. In the time between 5 pm and 6 am the program of Comedy Central Austria was shown. Until October 2014 there will be a simulcast broadcast of the program of Comedy Central on the shared frequency with Nickelodeon (8.15 pm to 5.45 am) and on the VIVA-frequency (5 pm to 6 am).

Local Shows

VIVA PUR: shows every 14 days, the "hottest news" comes to parties, people and trends, presented by VJ Mark Floth.
VIVA Austria Top 100: from May 2014 Jenny Posch hosts a weekly countdown show. 
VIVA Austria Top 20:  VJ Mark Floth newly presented every week and losers of the Austrian charts.

Programs

VJs
Mark Floth (since 2012)
Jenny Posch (since May 2014)

References

VIVA (TV station)
Television stations in Austria
Television channels and stations established in 2012
Television channels and stations disestablished in 2018
2012 establishments in Austria
2018 disestablishments in Austria